Shey is a village in the Leh district of Ladakh, India. It is located in the Leh tehsil, 15 km from Leh towards Hemis.

Shey was founded as the capital of Ladakh (then called Maryul), by the king Lhachen Palgyigon in the 10th century. It was gradually eclipsed by Leh around the 17th century after the growth of Central Asian trade.

History
Towards the end of the 9th century, the Tibetan prince Kyide Nyimagon (Skyid lde nyima gon), a great-grandson of the Tibetan king, Langdarma, established a small kingdom in Guge, which eventually grew to encompass the whole of western Tibet up to the Zoji La mountain pass. His eldest son, Lhachen Palgyigon, is credited with much of the conquest in the northwest. After his father's death, he inherited the region of Maryul ("lowland"), as Ladakh was then called. 

Several towns and castles are said to have been founded by Nyimagon, and he apparently ordered the construction of the main sculptures at Shey. In an inscription, he says he had them made for the religious benefit of the Tsanpo (the dynastical name of his father and ancestors), and of all the people of Ngari (Western Tibet). This shows that already in this generation Langdarma's opposition to Buddhism had disappeared. Shey, just 15 km east of modern Leh, was the ancient seat of the Ladakhi kings.

Geography
Shey is located in the upper Indus Valley, just 15 km east of the modern capital of Ladakh, Leh. It has an average elevation of 3,415 metres (11,204 feet).

Every year Sindhu Darshan Festival, is held here on the banks of the Indus River.

Demographics 
According to the 2011 census of India, Shey has 398 households. The effective literacy rate (i.e. the literacy rate of population excluding children aged 6 and below) is 78.95%.

Education
The Druk White Lotus School, whose patrons include the 14th Dalai Lama and Richard Gere, is also located in Shey.

Footnotes

References
 Francke, A. H. (1977). A History of Ladakh. A. H. Francke (Originally published as, A History of Western Tibet, (1907). 1977 Edition with critical introduction and annotations by S. S. Gergan & F. M. Hassnain. Sterling Publishers, New Delhi.
 Francke, A. H. (1914). Antiquities of Indian Tibet. Two Volumes. Calcutta. 1972 reprint: S. Chand, New Delhi.
 Hill, John E. (2009). Through the Jade Gate to Rome: A Study of the Silk Routes during the Later Han Dynasty, 1st to 2nd Centuries CE. BookSurge, Charleston, South Carolina. .

Villages in Leh tehsil